Dagoberto Miguel Peña Rincon (born 14 June, 1988) is  a Dominican professional basketball player. He plays for the Dominican national basketball team and CB Breogán.

High school
Peña was a promising baseball pitcher with a 90 mph fastball before switching to basketball. He left the Dominican Republic to attend a prep school in Florida before switching to Charlotte High School. In his senior year, he averaged 20 points, 10 rebounds and 2 assists.

College career
Peña played college basketball for the Marshall Thundering Herd men's basketball team, in his freshman year, he averaged 4.7 points, 2.0 rebounds and 0.8 assist. In his sophomore year, he averaged 7.3 points, 2.9 rebounds and 1.8 assists. In his Junior year, he averaged 7.2 points, 2.9 rebounds and 1.1 assists. In his senior year, he averaged 6 points, 1.5 rebounds and 0.9 assist.

Professional career
Peña played for the argentine side Centro Juventud Sionista in the 2014-15 season, he averaged 13.3 points, 1.8 rebounds and 1 assist. He moved to the spanish side Básquet Coruña in the LEB ORO, he averaged 9 points, 2.2 rebounds and 0.8 assist. 
He played in the 2016 FIBA Americas League for Metros de Santiago, he averaged 3 points, 0.7 rebound and 0.3 assist. In the 2016-17 season, he mivwd to the FC Barcelona Bàsquet B, where averaged 17.5 points, 4.1 rebounds and 2.3 assists. In the same season, he moved back to Básquet Coruña, he averaged 16 points, 4.1 rebounds and 2.5 assist. He moved to CB Estudiantes in the 2017-18 season, he averaged 4 points, 1 rebound and 0.8 assist. He played for CB Estudiantes in the 2017–18 Basketball Champions League,  he averaged 2.2 points, 1.7 rebounds and 0.9 assists. In the 2018-19 season, he moved to the Lithuania side BC Pieno žvaigždės, where he averaged 10 points, 3.2 rebounds and 2.2 assists. he moved back to CB Estudiantes in the same season and he averaged 4 points.
He also played for CB Estudiantes in the 2018–19 Basketball Champions League, he averaged 2 points, 3.5 rebounds and 1.5 assists. He moved to the CB Breogán in the 2019-20 season.

National team career
Peña represented the Dominican Republic national basketball team at the 2015 Marchand Continental Championship Cup in Puerto Rico, he averaged 4 points, 3 rebounds and 0.5 assist. He also played in the 2016 Centrobasket, where he averaged 1 point, 0.6 rebound and 0.2 assist. He participated in the 2017 FIBA AmeriCup, he averaged 2.7 points, 0.7 rebound and 0.7 assist. He played in the 2019 FIBA Basketball World Cup in China, where he averaged 1.6 points, 0.2 rebound and 0.6 assist.

References

1988 births
Living people
Basketball players from Florida
Básquet Coruña players
BC Pieno žvaigždės players
CB Breogán players
CB Estudiantes players
Charlotte High School (Punta Gorda, Florida) alumni
Dominican Republic expatriate basketball people in Argentina
Dominican Republic expatriate basketball people in Chile
Dominican Republic expatriate basketball people in Colombia
Dominican Republic expatriate basketball people in Lithuania
Dominican Republic expatriate basketball people in Spain
Dominican Republic expatriate basketball people in the United States
Dominican Republic expatriate basketball people in Uruguay
Dominican Republic expatriate basketball people in Venezuela
Dominican Republic men's basketball players
Liga ACB players
Marshall Thundering Herd men's basketball players
Sportspeople from Santo Domingo
2019 FIBA Basketball World Cup players